KFTH-DT (channel 67) is a television station licensed to Alvin, Texas, United States, serving as the Houston-area outlet for the Spanish-language network UniMás. It is owned and operated by TelevisaUnivision alongside Rosenberg-licensed Univision station KXLN-DT (channel 45). Both stations share studios near the Southwest Freeway (adjacent to the I-610/I-69 interchange) on Houston's southwest side, while KFTH's transmitter is located near Missouri City, in unincorporated northeastern Fort Bend County.

In addition to its own digital signal, KFTH is simulcast in high definition on KXLN's second digital subchannel (UHF channel 30.2 or virtual channel 45.2) from a separate transmitter near Missouri City.

History
The station first signed on the air on January 27, 1986 as KTHT, under the ownership of 4 Star Broadcasting. Operating as an independent station, it programmed a general entertainment format consisting of off-network drama series, children's programming, classic movies, game shows, home shopping programming during the overnight hours, and network programs not cleared by ABC affiliate KTRK-TV (channel 13), NBC affiliate KPRC-TV (channel 2) or CBS affiliate KHOU (channel 11). It had also broadcast Vietnamese programs during the weekend.

The station was unprofitable, and was subsequently sold to Silver King Broadcasting, the broadcasting arm of the Home Shopping Network, in 1987. The station changed its call letters to KHSH in November of that year, and began airing home shopping programming 24 hours a day.

There were plans to revert KHSH into a general entertainment independent station by 2001, under the local programming-infused "City Vision" format developed by USA Broadcasting (which assumed control of the Silver King stations in the mid-1990s), in which the station would have mixed locally produced programming, alongside first-run and off-network syndicated programs (including those produced by USA Broadcasting sister company Studios USA) and had already been adopted by its stations in cities such as Atlanta, Dallas-Fort Worth and Miami. However those plans changed in 2000, when USA Broadcasting announced that it would sell off its television station group. The Walt Disney Company made a bid to acquire the group (which had it purchased the USA stations, would have created a duopoly locally between KHSH and KTRK-TV), but was outbid by Spanish-language broadcaster Univision Communications. Once the purchase was finalized in 2001, most of the former USA stations, including KHSH, were used as charter owned-and-operated stations of Univision's new secondary broadcast network, Telefutura (which rebranded as UniMás in January 2013) when it launched on January 14, 2002. On that date, the station changed its call letters to KFTH-TV.

Newscasts
On April 4, 2011, sister station KXLN debuted a weekday morning news program for KFTH, called Vive La Mañana. Like the newscasts on KXLN, it was broadcast in high definition, and was produced out of the station's current news set. Dallas–Fort Worth sister station KUVN-DT used the same brands for their newscasts that are simulcast on sister station KSTR-DT; Vive La Mañana featured a different graphics and music package that is shared by both stations. The program was canceled in March 2015; KFTH is expected to broadcast KXLN's newscasts should KXLN interrupt programming.

Technical information

Subchannels
The station's digital signal is multiplexed:

Analog-to-digital conversion
KFTH-TV discontinued regular programming on its analog signal, over UHF channel 67, on June 12, 2009, as part of the federally mandated transition from analog to digital television. The station's digital signal remained on its pre-transition UHF channel 36, using PSIP to display KFTH-TV's virtual channel as 67 on digital television receivers, which was among the high band UHF channels (52-69) that were removed from broadcasting use as a result of the transition.

References

External links

Spanish-language television stations in Texas
FTH-DT
Television channels and stations established in 1986
1986 establishments in Texas
UniMás network affiliates
GetTV affiliates
Grit (TV network) affiliates